Olivier Uwingabire (born June 7, 1986 in Rwanda) is a Rwandan football defender currently playing for Kibuye FC.

Career
Uwingabire played previously for Kigali City F.C., Rayon Sport and Espérance Kigali.

Notes

1986 births
Living people
Rwandan footballers
Association football defenders
Rwanda international footballers
Rayon Sports F.C. players
People from Nyarugenge District